Acacia kimberleyensis is a shrub belonging to the genus Acacia and the subgenus Juliflorae that is endemic to parts of north western Australia.

It has glabrous and slender branchlets that are finely ribbed and resinous  when young. It blooms from June to July producing yellow flowers.

It is native to a small area in the Kimberley region of Western Australia. It is found among rocky outcrops and on plains growing in the sandstone rocks that are veined with quartzite as a part of Eucalyptus miniata woodland over spinifex communities.

See also
 List of Acacia species

References

kimberleyensis
Acacias of Western Australia
Plants described in 1917
Taxa named by William Vincent Fitzgerald